Ebenezer Syme (15 September 1825 – 13 March 1860) was a Scottish-Australian journalist, proprietor and manager of The Age.

Syme was born at North Berwick, Scotland, third son of George Alexander Syme, schoolmaster, and his wife Jean, née Mitchell. Ebenezer Syme's younger brother was David Syme. Ebenezer studied theology at the University of St Andrews to be educated for the ministry but finding difficulties in accepting the creeds of the day became an unattached evangelist, working in Liverpool, Manchester, other north country industrial towns and in Scotland. Syme also began to write for the reviews and succeeded George Eliot as assistant editor of the Westminster Review. Syme married Jane Hilton, née Rowan, of Manchester, on 21 April 1848.

In April 1853, partly for health reasons, Syme, his wife and three young sons sailed for Australia in the Abdalla. They landed in Melbourne on 17 July 1853 and Syme soon found work as a journalist. When the Age was founded in 1854 Syme joined the staff and two years later, the paper being in difficulties, it was sold to him and his brother, David. Ebenezer Syme was elected member for Loddon in November 1856 in the  Legislative Assembly of Victoria, but as this conflicted with his journalistic work he did not stand again when his term expired in 1859. Syme joined in the struggle for the opening up of the lands. Syme's health, however, began to suffer and he died after a lingering illness on 13 March 1860. He was survived by his wife, four sons and a daughter; they all returned to England, but all the children later returned to Victoria. One son, Joseph Cowen Syme, was for many years part proprietor and manager of The Age.  A granddaughter, Eveline Winifred Syme (1888–1961), was a notable Australian artist.  His most notable legacy, The Age, would remain in his family's hands until 1983.

References
Footnotes

Bibliography

External links
 Joseph Cowen Syme (1852-1916) Gravesite at Brighton General Cemetery (Vic)
 Sir Geoffrey Syme  "Sir Geoffrey Syme Journalist & Managing Editor of The Age from 1908 until 1942"
 

1825 births
1860 deaths
Journalists from Melbourne
Members of the Victorian Legislative Assembly
Scottish emigrants to colonial Australia
Alumni of the University of St Andrews
19th-century Australian journalists
19th-century Australian male writers
19th-century male writers
19th-century Australian politicians
Australian male journalists
People from North Berwick